This is a list of species in the genus Clastoptera.

Clastoptera species

 Clastoptera achatina Germar, 1839  (pecan spittlebug)
 Clastoptera arborina Ball, 1927  (red cedar spittlebug)
 Clastoptera arizonana Doering, 1928  (Arizona spittlebug)
 Clastoptera atrapicata Hamilton, 1977
 Clastoptera binotata Ball, 1895
 Clastoptera brunnea Ball, 1919
 Clastoptera canyonensia Doering, 1928
 Clastoptera delicata Uhler, 1875
 Clastoptera distincta Doering, 1928
 Clastoptera doeringae Hamilton, 1978  (mountain-juniper spittlebug)
 Clastoptera elongata Doering, 1928
 Clastoptera hyperici Gibson, 1920
 Clastoptera juniperina Ball, 1919  (juniper spittlebug)
 Clastoptera laevigata 
 Clastoptera lawsoni Doering, 1928
 Clastoptera lineatocollis Stål, 1854
 Clastoptera lugubris Ball, 1919
 Clastoptera media Doering, 1928
 Clastoptera newporta Doering, 1928
 Clastoptera obtusa (Say, 1825)  (alder spittlebug)
 Clastoptera octonotata 
 Clastoptera osborni Gillette and Baker, 1895
 Clastoptera ovata Doering, 1928
 Clastoptera pallidocephala Doering, 1928
 Clastoptera proteus Fitch, 1851  (dogwood spittlebug)
 Clastoptera saintcyri Provancher, 1872  (heath spittlebug)
 Clastoptera salicis Doering, 1926
 Clastoptera sierra Doering, 1928
 Clastoptera siskiyou Doering, 1928
 Clastoptera testacea Fitch, 1851
 Clastoptera texana Doering, 1928
 Clastoptera tricincta Doering, 1928
 Clastoptera undescribed 
 Clastoptera uniformia Doering, 1928
 Clastoptera xanthocephala Germar, 1839  (sunflower spittlebug)

References

Clastoptera